Tim and the Hidden People by Sheila K. McCullagh is a 1970s and 80's reading scheme, also known as Flightpath to Reading, originally devised for young children and intended for children with a reading age of eight-and-a-half to nine years. It consists of 32 books, each 32 pages long and illustrated by Pat Cook (1974-1979) and later Ray Mutimer (1980), written in a simple vocabulary. Four paperback "novella" books intended for older readers were also published in 1983 by Arnold-Wheaton.

The books were cited as an inspiration by the author Victoria Biggs, who used the "Hidden People" as an analogy for those suffering from dyspraxia.

Sheila McCullagh also wrote many other books, including Puddle Lane, The Village with Three Corners, Dragon Pirate Stories, and Griffin Pirate Stories.

Plot
The Tim and the Hidden People books are about a boy called Tim who lives in a house in The Yard. The books begin with Tim finding a key which enables him to see the Hidden People,  he befriends Tobias the black cat and has many adventures. Tobias has a son, Sebastian, who also has special power as one of the "strange ones" - those who are half "ordinary folk" and half "Hidden people".

Reception
Writing for the Times Educational Supplement in July 1980, Anne Barnes described the Tim and the Hidden People stories as "quite adventurous" saying "Tim encounters enough mysteries to keep the reader in suspense to the end". Child Education magazine described the series as "excellent" in an August 1979 review.

Books

Series A
A1. Tim and Tobias
A2. All the Fun of the Fair
A3. Tim Meets Captain Jory
A4. Tim and the Smugglers
A5. Tim and the Witches
A6. The Highwayman
A7. Magic in the Yard
A8. The Key

Series B
B1. The Return of the Key
B2. Captain Jory Lends a Hand
B3. The Stump People
B4. Watchers in the Yard
B5. Red for Danger
B6. At the House of the Safe Witch
B7. Tim in Hiding
B8. On the night of the Full Moon

Series C
C1. The Pool by the Whispering Trees
C2. Tim in Trouble
C3. On the Road to the North
C4. Riding into Danger
C5. Mandrake's Castle
C6. Escape by Night
C7. Three Fires on the Dark Tower
C8. Tim Rides on the Ghost Bus

Series D
D1. News from the North
D2. The Cry in the Dark
D3. The Shield Stone
D4. The Storm over the Sea
D5. The Cave of the Wind Witches
D6. In Diaman's Cave
D7. Danger on the Moor
D8. At the Hill of the Stone Prisons

Reprints
Series A to D were reprinted in single novel form, with reduced quantity black and white images, but with expanded text.  
Tim and Tobias: Magic in the Wind (Series A)
On the Night of the Full Moon (Series B)
Three Fires on the Dark Tower (Series C)
Wind Witches and Stone Men (Series D)

Novellas
Tim and the People of the Moonlight
The Wild Witches and the Talisman
Burglars in the Yard
Magic in the North

External links
Tim & Tobias online

References

Children's fiction books
Series of children's books